Mark Boulware (born 1948) is an American diplomat who served as the United States Ambassador to Chad from 2010 to 2013. He also served as the United States Ambassador to the Islamic Republic of Mauritania from 2007 until 2010.

Mr. Boulware was born in Oklahoma City, Oklahoma in 1948. He studied at the University of Rennes 2 – Upper Brittany in Rennes, France and at Midwestern State University in Wichita Falls, Texas, where he earned a BA (1971) and MA (1974). He graduated from the U.S. Army War College in Carlisle, Pennsylvania, in 1994. He is a recipient of the Department of State's Superior Honor Award, Senior Performance Pay Award and three Meritorious Honor Awards, as well as NASA's "Silver Snoopy" award. He was awarded the Pedro Ernesto Medal of Merit by the city of Rio and the Tamandaré Medal of Merit by the Brazilian Navy.

Mark Boulware was nominated as U.S. Ambassador to the Islamic Republic of Mauritania on July 26, 2007 and confirmed by the Senate on October 26, 2007. He presented his credentials to President Abdallahi on November 22, 2007. He became the United States Ambassador to Chad on September 8, 2010. A career member of the Senior Foreign Service, class of Minister-Counselor, he most recently served as Faculty Advisor at the National War College. He was previously assigned as Diplomat in Residence at Florida International University, in Miami, Florida.

Earlier overseas postings were as U.S. Consul General in Rio de Janeiro, Brazil from 2001 to July 2004, Deputy Chief of Mission at the American Embassy in San Salvador (1999–2001), Deputy Chief of Mission in Yaoundé, Cameroon (concurrently accredited to Equatorial Guinea) from 1996 to 1999; as Administrative Counselor in Bamako, Mali (1994–1996) and Gaborone, Botswana (1990–1993); as Administrative Officer in Banjul, The Gambia (1987–1989); as Supervisory General Services Officer in Ouagadougou, Burkina Faso (1985–1987); as Consular Officer in Maracaibo, Venezuela (1982–1985); and as General Services Officer in Jakarta, Indonesia (1980–1982).

Domestically, he was detailed to the U.S. House of Representatives as a Pearson Fellow (1989–1990), working for Congressman Dante Fascell. Before joining the Foreign Service in 1980, Mr. Boulware was a commissioned officer in the United States Army. He served tours of duty in Pirmasens, Germany and Hawthorne, Nevada, leaving active service as a captain.

He is an honorary citizen of Rio de Janeiro and an honorary chief of the Nso people of Cameroon. He is proficient in Portuguese, Spanish, French and Indonesian.

Sources
This article incorporates work from https://web.archive.org/web/20100527092947/http://mauritania.usembassy.gov/ambassador.html and https://web.archive.org/web/20100528140429/http://www.state.gov/r/pa/ei/biog/104222.htm, which are in the public domain as they are works of the United States Government.

References

External links
 United States Department of State: Chiefs of Mission for Chad
 United States Department of State: Chad
 United States Embassy in N'Djamena

|-

|-

1948 births
Living people
People from Oklahoma City
Midwestern State University alumni
Rennes 2 University alumni
United States Foreign Service personnel
United States Army War College alumni
Ambassadors of the United States to Mauritania
Ambassadors of the United States to Chad